The 6 Hours of Portimão is an  endurance race for sports cars held at Algarve International Circuit in Portugal.

History
The Algarve International Circuit was constructed in 2008 and has hosted European Le Mans Series races before with the 4 Hours of Portimão. In January 2021, it was announced that the track would host the opening round of the 2021 FIA World Endurance Championship, replacing the cancelled round at Sebring. On 26th February, 2021 it was confirmed that the race would take place behind closed doors. The race was initially scheduled to take place on the 2-4 April, 2021 but was later rescheduled to the second race of the season, held on the 12-13 June, 2021.

On 29 September 2022, the calendar of the 2023 FIA World Endurance Championship was announced on their website and YouTube channel. The calendar confirmed the return of the championship to the Algarve International Circuit, this time in a 6-hour format instead of an 8-hour format.

Winners

References

FIA World Endurance Championship races
Auto races in Portugal
2021 establishments in Portugal
Recurring sporting events established in 2021